Tondrakians were members of an anti-feudal, heretical Christian sect that flourished in medieval Armenia between the early 9th century and 11th century and centered on the district of Tondrak, north of Lake Van in Western Armenia.

History
The founder of the movement was Smbat Zarehavantsi, who advocated the abolition of the Church along with all of its traditional rites. Tondrakians denied the immortality of the soul, the afterlife, the church and its feudal rights. They supported property rights for peasants, as well as equality between men and women. Tondrakians organized their communities in much the same fashion as did the early Christians under the Roman Empire during the first three centuries. They also participated in the peasant revolts of the 10th century, particularly in Ayrarat and Syunik. The Tondrakian movement resembled the Paulician movement in many ways, and various scholars consider it a continuation of the Paulician movement under different conditions, when Armenia was independent. The Paulician movement was of a social nature and simultaneously a resistance movement, directed against the Arabs and Byzantines, while the Tondrakian movement was likewise of a social nature and was directed against the developing feudal system.

Background
In the early 10th century, many regions of Armenia were undergoing peasant uprisings, which also first began in forms of open social protests, eventually adopting religious aspects. Contemporary historian and eyewitness Hovhanes Draskhanakertsi describes how the peasants of Ayrarat fought against their feudal lords and landowners: destroying their castles and property. Peasant revolts appear also in Syunik. After the construction of Tatev Monastery was completed in 906, the ownership of the adjacent villages was transferred by a special princely edict to the monks of the monastery. Flatly refusing to obey this edict, the peasants of Tsuraberd, Tamalek, Aveladasht and other villages carried on a prolonged struggle against the churchgoers. Several times, this revolt transformed into an open uprising. With the aid of Smbat, the prince of Syunik, the monastery managed after a while to take control of Aveladasht and Tamalek. The struggle to take control of Tsuraberd bore a bloodier nature. Here, the peasants attacked the monastery and plundered it. Smbat eventually suppressed the uprising. However, after a short while, the people of Tsuraberd revolted again. Peasant uprisings continued with interruptions throughout the 10th century. In 990, the King of Syunik, Vasak, burned down Tsuraberd and pacified its inhabitants. This led to the widespread acceptance of the Tondrakian movement among the lower classes of people in the late 10th century.

Resurgence
After the suppression of the peasant revolts, the Tondrakians suffered a minor decline. However, by the beginning of the 11th century, the movement enveloped many regions of Armenia. Tondrakian villages and communities appeared in Upper Armenia, Vaspurakan, Mokq and other provinces. Historians mention various leaders of the Tondrakians of this time such as Thoros, Ananes, Hakop and Sarkis. The wide acceptance of the movement began to worry secular and spiritual feudal lords, Byzantine authorities and even Muslims.

Decline
Armenian secular and spiritual feudal lords joined forces with neighbouring Muslim Arab emirs as well as Byzantines in the persecution of Tondrakians. The movement quickly spread to Shirak, Turuberan, and the Armenian regions of Taron, Hark, and Mananali (subject to Byzantium). After suffering a number of defeats at the hands of Byzantium, most Tondrakians were deported to Thrace in the 10th century. Following the Byzantine conquest of the Bagratuni Kingdom of Ani in 1045, the movement experienced a new resurgence, this time within large cities like Ani where they began appealing to the lower ranks of the nobility and the clergy. The Tondrakian movement broke into three different directions during its last years, the most radical of which began advocating atheism as well as doubt in the afterlife and the immortality of the human soul. By the middle of the 11th century, the Byzantine governor of Taron and Vaspurakan, Gregory Magistros, managed to eliminate all remnants of Tondrakians. Historian Aristakes Lastivertsi describes the elimination of Tondrakians in great detail.

Beliefs
Tenth century Armenian theologian and monk Gregory of Narek wrote a critical summary of Tondrakian doctrines in his Letter to the Abbot of Kchaw Concerning the Refutation of the Accursed Tondrakians. He lists the following among other accusations:
They deny our ordination, which the apostles received from Christ.
They deny the Holy Communion as the true body and blood of Christ.
They deny our Baptism as being mere bath water.
They consider Sunday as on a level with other days.
They refuse genuflection.
They deny the veneration of the cross.
They ordain each other and thus follow self-conferred priesthood.
They do not accept marriage as a sacrament.
They reject the matagh as being a Jewish practice.
They are sexually promiscuous.

Notes

References

Primary
 History Regarding the Sufferings Occasioned by Foreign Peoples Living Around Us, Aristakes Lastiversti
 History of Armenia, Hovhanes Draskhanakertsi

Secondary
Great Soviet Encyclopedia, 3rd edition
Vrej Nersessian: The Tondrakian Movement, Princeton Theological Monograph Series, Pickwick Publications, Allison Park, Pennsylvania, 1988 (online at internet archive)
Vahan M. Kurkjian: A History of Armenia (Chapter 37, The Paulikians and the Tondrakians), New York, 1959, 526 pp.
Arsen A. Guerguizian: The Movement of the Paulician-Tondrakians in the Armenian Apostolic Church-From the Seventh to the Twelfth Centuries, Beirut, 1970

Yianni Cartledge & Brenton Griffin, ‘Sunk in the…Gulf of Perdition’: The ‘Heretical’ Paulician and Tondrakian Movements in the Periphery of the Medieval Byzantine Empire', Cerae, 9, 2022, 235-271.

External links
Distinguishing Evangelicals from Paulicians By Rev. Barkev Darakjian (Saved at Internet Archive)

Christianity in Armenia
Former Christian denominations
Heresy in Christianity in the Middle Ages
History of religion in Armenia
Christianity in the Byzantine Empire
9th century in Armenia
10th century in Armenia
11th century in Armenia
Byzantine Anatolia